is a Japanese professional shogi player, ranked 9-dan.

Early life
Osamu Nakamura was born in Machida, Tokyo on November 7, 1962. He was promoted to the rank of 1-dan in 1978 and was awarded full professional status and the rank of 4-dan in July 1980.

Shogi professional
Nakamura is a member of the so-called Shōwa 55 group (55年組), a group of eight strong players that become professional in 1980–1981 (Year 55 of the Shōwa period) and won numerous shogi tournaments.

On June 9, 2021, Nakamura became the 24th professional shogi player to win 800 games.

Promotion history
The promotion history for Nakamura is as follows:
 6-kyū: 1976
 1-dan: 1978
 4-dan: July 2, 1980
 5-dan: April 1, 1982
 6-dan: April 1, 1983
 7-dan: April 1, 1986
 8-dan: October 15, 1993
 9-dan: January 23, 2008

Titles and other championships
Nakamura has appeared in major title matches a total of five times and is a two-time winner of the Ōshō title. He also won the 14th  title in 1983 for his only non-major shogi championship.

Awards and honors
Nakamura has received a number of Japan Shogi Association Annual Shogi Awards throughout his career. He won the award for "Best New Player" in 1981; the "Fighting-spirit Award" in 1984 and 1986; and the "Distinguished Service Award" in 1985.

In addition, Nakamura received the "25 Years Service Award"in recognition of being an active professional for twenty-five years in 2005 as well as the "Shogi Honor Fighting-spirit Award" for winning 600 official games as a professional in 2006.

Professional Shogi Players Group
He was first elected as a vice-president in April 2011, and served in that capacity until the end of February 2017 when he was selected to replace Yasumitsu Satō at a special session of the association. Nakamura served out the remainder of Sato's term, and was re-elected as president for a new two-year term at the end of May 2017. He was re-elected for another two-year term as president in June 2019.

Notes

References

External links
ShogiHub: Professional Player Info · Nakamura, Osamu

1962 births
Japanese shogi players
Living people
People from Machida, Tokyo
Professional shogi players
Professional shogi players from Tokyo Metropolis
Ōshō
Shinjin-Ō